Theodore D. Parsons (May 24, 1894 – October 20, 1978) was an American lawyer who served as New Jersey Attorney General from 1949 to 1954.

Biography
Parsons was born on May 24, 1894, in La Crosse, Wisconsin. After moving to New Jersey, he graduated from Red Bank High School and attended Princeton University. During World War I he served as a test pilot with the United States Army Air Service. After graduating from Columbia Law School, he passed the bar in 1919 and began practicing law. He was named by Governor Alfred E. Driscoll to serve as New Jersey Attorney General, and took office on  February 4, 1948, serving in that role until 1954.

References

1894 births
1978 deaths
Columbia Law School alumni
New Jersey Attorneys General
Politicians from La Crosse, Wisconsin
People from Little Silver, New Jersey
Princeton University alumni
20th-century American politicians
Military personnel from New Jersey
Military personnel from Wisconsin